Rhema Chukwardiamara Obed (born 11 September 1991) is an English footballer who last played as a defensive midfielder for Krško in the Slovenian PrvaLiga.

Club career

Arsenal Youth
Obed first signed for Arsenal in 2004 as a schoolboy at the age of 13 signing scholarship terms in 2008. A product of the Arsenal Academy, Obed came to prominence during the Gunners' 2008–09 Premier Academy League and 2009–10 Premier Academy League.

During a trial with Danish Superliga club OB in 2010, he appeared in the Danish Reserves League on 23 November. He also had trials with Norwich City, Queens Park Rangers and Leeds United after his release by Arsenal.

Geylang International
In January 2012 Obed signed for Geylang United. On 23 March, he scored his first goal for the club, putting the Eagles ahead in the ninth minute with a right-footed volley against Balestier Khalsa. Within the same year, Obed was invited to attend Hapoel Tel Aviv's pre-season training camp in Hungary. Although he impressed with two assists in three games, Hapoel Tel Aviv opted out of signing him, rather choosing to sign the former Manchester United midfielder Eric Djemba-Djemba.

Whilst playing for Hapoel Tel Aviv, Sektzia Ness Ziona enquired about Rhema's availability, which prompted him to sign a 1-year deal, but he left in September.

Ethnikos Gazoros

On 28 January 2013, Obed signed for Ethnikos Gazoros in Football League of Greece. totalling 8 appearances for half the season.

Rapid Bucharest
Obed signed for Rapid Bucharest in Romania on a 3-year contract, but left in 2014 due to unpaid wages.

Sheffield
In July 2014 he joined Sheffield of Northern Premier League Division One South, at level 8 of the English football league system.

Krško
Ahead of the 2015–16 Slovenian PrvaLiga season he joined newly promoted Krško, but left again in October the same year.

Style of play
Obed plays primarily as a defensive midfielder, His key strengths are his physical ability and dribbling, often switching from defensive to offences stances as the match progresses.

International career
Obed is eligible to represent Nigeria due to him being of Nigerian descent. In 2006, he played for the England national under-16 football team.

Honours
Arsenal
Premier Academy League: 2008–09, 2009–10

References

External links
http://www.givemefootball.com/player-profiles/rhema-obed

Living people
1991 births
Footballers from Greater London
English footballers
England youth international footballers
Association football midfielders
Arsenal F.C. players
Geylang International FC players
Sektzia Ness Ziona F.C. players
FC Rapid București players
Sheffield F.C. players
NK Krško players
Singapore Premier League players
Football League (Greece) players
Liga II players
Northern Premier League players
Slovenian PrvaLiga players
English expatriate footballers
Expatriate footballers in Singapore
Expatriate footballers in Israel
Expatriate footballers in Greece
Expatriate footballers in Romania
Expatriate footballers in Slovenia
English expatriate sportspeople in Singapore
English expatriate sportspeople in Israel
English expatriate sportspeople in Greece
English expatriate sportspeople in Romania
English expatriate sportspeople in Slovenia
Black British sportspeople